Drogden is a channel through Øresund. The trench is located on the Danish side of the Øresund, between Saltholm and Amager. The road and railway connection between Denmark and Sweden passes below it in the Drogden Tunnel. The maximum depth for ships to pass is 8 meters. Drogden is heavily trafficked, and about 30 000 ships pass per year in the fairway.

References 

Straits of the Baltic Sea
Straits of Denmark